Ouroube Sports Club is a Syrian women's professional basketball club based in Aleppo. It is part of the Antranik Youth Association.

Honours
Syrian Women Basketball League
Eighth place (2): 2009 – 2021
Syrian Women Basketball League 2
Runners-up (1): 2020

Current roster
Player line-up for the 2021-2022 season:

Betty Minasian - Nancy Begon - Marya Minasian - Rita Nahy - Naveer Narcis  - Lucy Bodagian - Carla Barsumian - Mirna Akmkijan - Anna Aslanian - Patel Kirgizska - Natalie Nagar - Karen Chejo

Head Coach: Nazu Qayumji

Assistant Coach: Lucy Amirkhanian

References

Basketball teams in Syria
Sport in Aleppo
Basketball teams established in 1923
Sport in Syria

External links

Videos
Tishreen SC vs. Ouroube SC SWBL 2021-22 Youtube.com video